The Ibadan Province is an ecclesiastical province of the Church of Nigeria. It was created when the division into ecclesiastical provinces was adopted in 2002, and it comprises 19 dioceses, 117 archdeaconries and 623 parishes.

It comprised the following 19 dioceses in 2008:

 Ajayi Crowther (11 March 2007; bishop: Olugbenga Olukemi Oduntan)
 Ekiti Kwara (26 May 2008; bishop: Andrew Ajayi)
 Ibadan (founded 25 January 1952, from the Diocese of Lagos; bishop: Joseph Akinfenwa)
 Ibadan North (14 December 1998; bishop: Segun Okubadejo)
 Ibadan South (13 July 1999; bishop: Jacob Ajetunmobi)
 Ife (4 November 1990; bishop: Olubunmi Akinlade)
 Ife East (28 May 2008; bishop: Rufus Okeremi)
 Igbomina (14 July 1999; bishop: Michael Akinyemi)
 Ilesa (2 November 1974; bishop: Samuel Sowole)
 Jebba (25 May 2008; bishop: Oluwaseun Adeyinka Aderogba)
 Kwara (1 November 1974; bishop: Olusegun Adeyemi)
 New Bussa (9 March 2007; bishop:Israel Amoo)
 Offa (14 July 1999; bishop: Akintunde Popoola)
 Ogbomoso (18 March 2005; bishop: Matthew Osunade)
 Oke-Ogun (11 March 2007; bishop: Solomon Amusan)
 Oke-Osun (25 January 1993; bishop:  Oluwagbemiro Fabuluje)
 Omu-Aran (10 March 2007; bishop:  Philip Adeyemo)
 Osun (3 August 1987; bishop: James Afolabi Popoola)
 Oyo (19 November 2003; bishop: Jacob Ola Fasipe)

Dioceses in 2021 
After the creation of the Province of Kwara, the list of Dioceses and Bishops in the Province of Ibadan in 2021 was:

Anglican Province of Ibadan; Archbishop: Segun Okubadejo
Ajayi Crowther Diocese; Bishop: Olugbenga Oduntan
Ibadan Diocese; Bishop: Joseph Akinfenwa
Ibadan North Diocese; Bishop: Segun Okubadejo
Ibadan South Diocese; Bishop: Akintunde Popoola
Ife Diocese; Bishop: Olubunmi Akinlade
Ife East Diocese; Bishop: Oluseyi Oyelade
Ijesa North East Diocese; Bishop: Joseph Olusola
Ijesha North Missionary Diocese; Bishop: Isaac Oluyamo
Ilesa Diocese; Bishop: Samuel Olubayu Sowale
Ilesa South West Diocese; Bishop: Samuel Egbebunmi
Ogbomoso Diocese; Bishop: Titus Babatunde Olayinka
Oke-Ogun Diocese; Bishop: Cornelius Adagbada
Oke-Osun Diocese; Bishop: Joshua Foluso Taiwo
Osun Diocese; Bishop: Foluso Olugbenga Babatunji
Osun North Diocese; Bishop: Abiodun Olaoye
Osun North East Diocese; Bishop: Ebenezer Akorede Okuyelu
Oyo Diocese; Bishop: Williams Oluwarotimi Aladekugbe

Archbishops of the Province
?–2013: Joseph Akinfenwa, Bishop of Ibadan (re-elected 2007)
2013–present: Segun Okubadejo, Bishop of Ibadan North

References

External links
Ibadan Province at the List of Ecclesiastical Provinces of the Church of Nigeria
Ibadan Province at the Church of Nigeria Official Website

Church of Nigeria ecclesiastical provinces
Religion in Ibadan